Westover is a historic mansion on a Southern plantation in Milledgeville, Georgia, USA.

History
The plantation was established in the late 1810s. The great house was built in 1819 for John Clark, who served as the governor of Georgia from 1819 - 1824. It was later purchased by Congressman Seaton Grantland. It was inherited by his daughter, Mrs. DuBignon, in the 1860s.

The plantation was acquired by Bim Richardson in the 1920s, who sold it to Carl Bentley in the 1940s.

Architectural significance
The plantation house has been listed on the National Register of Historic Places since June 22, 1979.

References

Houses on the National Register of Historic Places in Georgia (U.S. state)
Houses completed in 1819
Houses in Baldwin County, Georgia
Plantation houses in Georgia (U.S. state)
National Register of Historic Places in Baldwin County, Georgia